XERSV-AM is a radio station on 810 AM in Ciudad Obregón, Sonora. It is known as Tribuna Radio after the newspaper of the same name.

History
XERSV received its concession on July 7, 1967. It was owned by Luis Salcido Flores and sold to the newspaper in 1970.

The station folded in August 2019 due to economic reasons. By November 2020, unionized station employees had still not been paid their required severance.

References

Radio stations in Sonora